Josephine Stephenson (born 1990) is a French-British composer, arranger, singer and instrumentalist who works across a variety of musical genres.

Early life and education 
Stephenson learned cello and piano as a child, and as a teenager attended the Maîtrise de Radio France (the choir school of Radio France). After briefly studying Philosophy at the Sorbonne University in Paris, she moved to the UK where she attended Clare College, University of Cambridge as a choral scholar and received a Bachelor’s degree in Music. She later obtained a Master’s degree in Composition from the Royal College of Music, having studied under Kenneth Hesketh. In 2017-2019 she was a 'Writing The Future' composer with the London Sinfonietta.

Career 
During her Masters studies, Stephenson's orchestration was likened to Claude Vivier, and her first short opera On False Perspective was staged in the Britten Theatre, co-produced by Tête à Tête and the Royal College of Music.

In 2015 she collaborated with FellSwoop Theatre on a devised piece of musical theatre, Ghost Opera, first performed at the Aix-en-Provence Festival and developed with The Lowry. In the same year she won ‘Best Composer’ at Underwire Film Festival for her work on the short film Emma, Change The Locks.

In 2016 Stephenson was commissioned by Radio France to write a piece for the Maîtrise, Ce n'était pas nous, premiered at the Maison de la Radio.

She contributed to the world’s first concerto for drum machine and orchestra in 2018, in a night curated by Nonclassical at Village Underground. The same year, after working with the band Daughter, Stephenson joined singer Elena Tonra's solo project, Ex:Re, playing cello, providing backing vocals, and arranging songs. In February 2021, an arrangement by Stephenson of Tonra's album with the 12 Ensemble string orchestra, was released.

Stephenson's song cycle Une Saison en Enfer, on text by Arthur Rimbaud, was written for and premiered by Allan Clayton, Aurora Orchestra, and conductor Brett Dean at the Wigmore Hall in London, December 2019. It was nominated for the Ivor Novello Awards in 2020.

A singer and multi-instrumentalist, she has appeared on albums by the Arctic Monkeys and Jon Hopkins, among others.

She is one of the three artistic directors of the London-based concert series and record label Listenpony, alongside Freya Waley-Cohen and William Marsey.

Notable works

Vocal
Une saison en enfer (2019) for tenor and string orchestra (Wigmore Hall commission)
Between the war and you (2017) for soprano, clarinet, harp and double bass (Spitalfields Music commission)

Choral
Into the Wreck (2021) for mixed chorus and narrator  
Now that heaven and earth and the wind are silent (2017) for SATB choir (Spitalfields Music commission) 
Ce n'était pas nous (2016) for children's voices (Radio France commission)
if only (2015) for 40 voices (Bristol Old Vic commission)

Ensemble
Shuffle (2019) for nine instruments (London Sinfonietta commission)

Chamber
Lignéchos (2017) for violin, clarinet and piano (Miroirs Étendus commission)
All casual bits and scraps, assembled (2015) for percussion quartet

Solo
Cut Hold (2018) for solo cello (London Sinfonietta commission)
Enero (2018) for solo guitar
Sestina (2015) for solo piano
Anamnesis (2013) for solo cello

Orchestra
Writhen (2019), for chamber orchestra (Britten Sinfonia commission)
Concerto for Drum Machine & Orchestra:V (2018) (Nonclassical commission)
Abend (2013), for small orchestra

Opera
NARCISSE (2019) (ARCAL Lyrique commission)
Les Constellations - Une Théorie (2016) (Miroirs Étendus commission, Opéra de Lille co-production)
Ghost Opera (2015)
On False Perspective (2014)

Album contributions

References

External links
 Official website
 

1990 births
Living people
British women classical composers
People from Les Lilas
21st-century classical composers
21st-century French composers
21st-century classical musicians
21st-century British composers
21st-century English women musicians
21st-century French women musicians
French women classical composers
Alumni of the Royal College of Music
Alumni of Clare College, Cambridge
French emigrants to the United Kingdom